Frank Gallagher ( – 20 March 1966), was an English professional rugby league footballer who played in the 1920s.

Background
Frank Gallagher's death aged 71 was registered in Leeds district, West Riding of Yorkshire, England.

Playing
Gallagher was selected to go on the 1920 Great Britain Lions tour of Australasia and won caps for Great Britain while at Dewsbury in 1920 against Australia (3 matches), in 1921-22 against Australia, while at Batley in 1924 against Australia (3 matches), and New Zealand (3 matches), and in 1926-27 against New Zealand (2 matches). He also won caps for England while at Batley in 1923 against Other Nationalities, in 1924 against Other Nationalities, in 1925 against Wales (2 matches), in 1926 against Wales, and Other Nationalities, in 1927 against Wales, while at Leeds in 1928 against Wales.

Only five players have played test matches for Great Britain as both a back, and a forward, they are; Colin Dixon, Frank Gallagher, Laurie Gilfedder, Billy Jarman and Harry Street.

Gallagher missed Batley's 13-7 victory over Wigan in the Championship Final during the 1923–24 season at The Cliff, Broughton on Saturday 3 May 1924, while on the 1924 Great Britain Lions tour of Australia and New Zealand.

Gallagher played  in Batley's 8-9 defeat by Wakefield Trinity in the 1924–25 Yorkshire County Cup Final during the 1924–25 season at Headingley Rugby Stadium, Leeds on Saturday 22 November 1924, in front of a crowd of 25,546.

References

External links
Search for "Frank Gallagher" at britishnewspaperarchive.co.uk

1890s births
1966 deaths
Batley Bulldogs captains
Batley Bulldogs players
Dewsbury Rams players
England national rugby league team players
English rugby league players
Great Britain national rugby league team players
Leeds Rhinos players
Place of birth missing
Rugby league five-eighths
Rugby league halfbacks
Rugby league locks
Rugby league second-rows
Yorkshire rugby league team players